The eleventh season of The Voice began airing on 18 April 2022. In October 2021, it was announced Seven Network had once again picked up the series for its eleventh season, set to broadcast in 2022. At the same time, it was announced that Keith Urban, Jessica Mauboy, Rita Ora, and Guy Sebastian would all return as coaches. Sonia Kruger was also announced to return as host.

Similar to last season, the finale was pre-recorded and the winner was determined by a viewer poll. Lachie Gill was declared the winner, marking Rita Ora's first win as a coach.

Coaches and host

On 11 October 2021, it was announced that Keith Urban, Jessica Mauboy, Rita Ora, and Guy Sebastian would all return as coaches for the eleventh series. Sonia Kruger returned as host.

Teams
Colour key
  Winner
  Finalist
  Eliminated in the Semifinal
  Eliminated in the Singoffs
  Eliminated in the Battles
  Eliminated in the Callbacks

Blind auditions 
In the blind auditions, the coaches complete their teams with 12 members each. Each coach can block another two times and the coach who is blocked is unable to pitch for the artist. However, new to this season, a coach can block at any time, even during their pitch as long as the blocker turned his/her chair. Also, this season introduces the  Battle Pass. In this twist, coaches will have a new button, in addition to the main button and the block buttons. The Battle Pass allows a coach to automatically send the contestant to the battles. Each coach could only press the button for one artist in the entire phase.

Callbacks 
The Callbacks aired on 4 May. In this round, each coach needs to trim down their artists from 12 down to 6. Shaun Wessel, Faith Sosene, Celestial Utai, and Theoni Marks have been given Battle Passes from their coaches. This allows them to skip the Callbacks, and go straight to the battles.

Each coach splits the remaining eleven team members into groups of three or four. Those three or four artists then take to the stage together and each performs a different song based on the theme selected by the coaches. In each group, the coach can select one, two, or all of them; as long as each coach has selected five artists to advance to the battles. 

In total, only six from each team will advance to the battle rounds: five selected by the coach in the callbacks (with some reprising their blind audition song and not required to perform in the sing-off in front of an audience) and the Battle Pass recipient. The artists not chosen in this round will be eliminated.

Battles 
The Battles aired on 8 May and 15 May. In the battles, coaches are to cut their team from 6 to 3 by paring two of their artists to sing the same song as a duet. 

Team Guy and Keith performed on the first night of battles and Team Jess and Rita performed on the second night.

Singoffs 
In the Singoffs, coaches pick one of their 3 or 4 battle winners to go straight through the Semifinals. Then the 2 or 3 remaining artists must Singoff for the last remaining spot on their team to advance to the semifinal.

Finals

Semi-final
The Semifinal aired on 22 May. The 8 remaining artists sing different songs for a place in the Grand Final. At the end of the episode, coaches are only allowed to pick one artist from their team to advance to the Grand Final.

Grand Finale 
The Grand Finale was broadcast on 29 May 2022. Each artist performed a solo song and a duet with their coach. Similar to the last two seasons, this was the only episode of the season where the results were determined by public vote and not by the coaches. Lachie Gill was declared the winner, marking Rita Ora's first win as a coach.

Contestants who appeared on previous season or TV shows
Thando Sikwila appeared in the third season under Team Kylie, but was stolen by Ricky Martin and was eliminated in the sing-off.
Jay Sierra was on the fourth season of The X Factor, as a member of The Collective, where they came third.
Jael Wena was a finalist in The Voice: Generations as a group act with her family under Team Guy. She was also a contestant on season 9 of Australia's Got Talent and got eliminated in the semi-finals. She also represented Australia at Junior Eurovision Song Contest 2018.
Ethan Conway was on season 4, and was on Team Jessie J and eliminated in the super battles.
Chloe Kandetzki was on season 6, and was on Team Kelly then eliminated in the knockouts.
Chriddy Black was on season 8, and was on Team Guy and eliminated in the battles.
Dominic Clarke was a gymnast who competed in the 2020 Summer Olympics in Tokyo, Japan

Ratings
Colour key:
  – Highest rating during the season
  – Lowest rating during the season

References

2022 Australian television seasons